Rob Penney (born 27 April 1964) is a former New Zealand rugby union player, playing at No.8 for Canterbury throughout his career. 
He has served in various coaching roles since 2005. He was the head coach of Australian Super Rugby side Waratahs in 2020 and 2021.

Coaching career

Canterbury and New Zealand
Penney coached Canterbury rugby in New Zealand from 2006 to 2011, and led them to win four ITM Cup's in a row.
He also coached the New Zealand under-20 rugby union team, until he left after the 2012 IRB Junior World Championship.

Munster
On 3 May 2012, it was announced that Penney would be the new Munster new head coach, signing a two-year contract. He started in the role in July 2012 with Anthony Foley remaining on as forwards coach.
On appointing Penney, Munster rugby CEO Garrett Fitzgerald said; "We conducted a thorough search to find a replacement for Tony McGahan and were delighted with the calibre of the candidates".

Penney took charge of his first competitive game as Munster coach on 1 September 2012, in a Rabo Direct Pro 12 match against Edinburgh Rugby at Murrayfield. Despite a slow start, Munster won the game 23–18, to get his coaching career with Munster off to a winning start. Penney's Munster side had a surprise loss in the 2012–13 Heineken Cup on 13 October 2012, when they threw away an early lead against Racing Métro 92 and lost the game 22–17, but crucially secured a losing bonus point. Munster got their campaign back on track against Edinburgh Rugby the next week with a bonus point victory, winning 33–0 on the day and leaving themselves in a strong position to get out of the group stages. A victory and a loss followed in Munster's next two Heineken Cup matches, both against Saracens. Munster secured qualification for the quarter-finals in their last match against Racing Métro 92, beating them 29–6 to arrange a quarter-final against Harlequin F.C. Munster, despite being massive underdogs, beat Harlequins 18–12 to reach the semi-final. Munster lost the semi-final 16–10 to ASM Clermont Auvergne.

In February 2014, Penney announced that he would be leaving Munster at the end of the 2013–14 season, having turned down the option of a third year in charge. Penney won the 2013–14 Pro 12 Coach of the Season Award in May 2014.

Shining Arcs
The Japanese Top League team NTT Communications Shining Arcs announced Penney as their new head coach for the next season on 11 April 2014.

New South Wales Waratahs
Penney joined Australian Super Rugby side Waratahs on a three-year contract in October 2019. On 28 March 2021, the Waratahs sacked Penney as head coach after a struggling 0-5 start to the 2021 Super Rugby AU season. He was replaced by Jason Gilmore and Chris Whitaker as interim coaches for the rest of the season.

References

External links
Munster Rugby Profile

Living people
1964 births
New Zealand rugby union players
New Zealand rugby union coaches
Munster Rugby non-playing staff